In surface chemistry, the Hertz–Knudsen equation, also known as Knudsen-Langmuir equation describes evaporation rates, named after Heinrich Hertz and Martin Knudsen.

Applications

Non-dissociative adsorption (Langmuirian adsorption)
The Hertz–Knudsen equation describes the sticking of gas molecules on a surface by expressing the time rate of change of the concentration of molecules on the surface as a function of the pressure of the gas and other parameters:

where:

See also
 Langmuir (unit)

References

Surface science